The 1985 Brown Bears football team was an American football team that represented Brown University during the 1985 NCAA Division I-AA football season. Brown finished fourth in the Ivy League. 

In their second season under head coach John Rosenberg, the Bears compiled a 5–4–1 record and outscored opponents 200 to 128. B. Heffernan, P. McCormack and T. Moskala were the team captains. 

The Bears' 4–3 conference record placed fourth in the Ivy League standings. They outscored Ivy opponents 157 to 138. 

Brown played its home games at Brown Stadium in Providence, Rhode Island.

Schedule

References

Brown
Brown Bears football seasons
Brown Bears football